Alpina is a German automobile manufacturing company.

Alpina may also refer to:
Alpina (moth), a genus of moth
Alpina Productos Alimenticios, a Colombian dairy, food, and beverage company
Alpina snowmobiles, an Italian brand of snowmobile manufactured by Alpina s.r.l
Alpina Žiri, a Slovenian shoe company
Alpina, a hamlet in Lewis County, New York
Alpina Watches, a Swiss watchmaking company owned by Frederique Constant Holding SA

See also
 Alpine (disambiguation)
 Alpini (disambiguation)
 Alpino (disambiguation)
 Porta Alpina, a proposed Swiss underground railway station
 Via Alpina, a network of five long-distance hiking trails in Europe